Packwood may refer to:

People
 Packwood (surname)

Places
 Packwood, California, former town
 Packwood, Iowa, city
 Packwood, Washington, unincorporated community
 Packwood Dam, located nearby
 Packwood Lake, impounded by the dam
 Packwood Glacier, Washington
 Packwood Creek, California
 Packwood, England, a village in the counties of the West Midlands and Warwickshire
 Packwood House, Tudor mansion in England owned by the National Trust